Frank Wesley Griffith  (November 18, 1872 – December 8, 1908), was a professional baseball player who pitched in the Major Leagues for the 1892 Chicago Colts and 1894 Cleveland Spiders. He played college baseball at Northwestern University. He played in the minors in 1895 and 1896.

External links

1872 births
1908 deaths
Major League Baseball pitchers
Chicago Colts players
19th-century baseball players
Port Huron Marines players
Battle Creek Adventists players
Kalamazoo Celery Eaters players
Twin Cities Twins players
Oil City Oilers players
Rockford Forest City players
Kalamazoo Kazoos players
Kalamazoo Zooloos players
Baseball players from Illinois
People from Iroquois County, Illinois